Richard Leduc (born 1941) is a French actor. He appeared in more than thirty films from 1969 to 1999.

Leduc makes his debut in 1967 television series Les oiseaux rares (The rare birds). He played the lead role of Simon in his feature film debut, Robert Benayoun's 1968 Paris n'existe pas (with Serge Gainsbourg). Shortly thereafter he starred in Alain Robbe-Grillet's L'Éden et après. In 1970 he played Félix de Vandenesse alongside Delphine Seyrig in Marcel Cravenne's film The lily of the valley, Maxence with Claude Jade in the TV saga Mauregard by Claude de Givray and the leading role of Saint-Brice in We are no longer in the forest. Robbe-Grillet also cast him for N. a pris les dés ..., Benayoun hired him a second time in 1975 for Serious as Pleasure (Sérieux comme le plaisir) as Bruno, co-star of Jane Birkin. In 1974, he played with Niels Arestrup a gay couple in Miss O'Gynie et les hommes fleurs, in which the two men resist the temptations of a young woman.

In the 1970s, a movie star, Leduc is in the 1980s (including Mieux courir vaut with Christian Clavier) and 1990s (including Ce que savait Maisie by Edouard Molinaro ) in movies and TV and devotes more and more for stage work.

Selected filmography

References

External links
 

1941 births
Living people
People from Argenteuil
French male film actors
French male television actors
20th-century French male actors
Date of birth missing (living people)
Place of birth missing (living people)